Olesia Viktorovna Zhurakivska (born August 13, 1973, in Kyiv) is a Ukrainian film and theatre actress, best known for her roles in the Ukrainian television series Papik and Krіposna. She was invested with the Order of Princess Olga in 2021.

References

External links
 

1973 births
Living people
20th-century Ukrainian actresses
21st-century Ukrainian actresses
Ukrainian film actresses
Ukrainian stage actresses
Ukrainian television actresses
Recipients of the Order of Princess Olga, 3rd class
Recipients of the title of Merited Artist of Ukraine
Russian Academy of Theatre Arts alumni